Alfred Wilson (20 May 1902 – 2 June 1984) was an Australian rules footballer who played for the Melbourne Football Club in the Victorian Football League (VFL). His brother, Percy, was Melbourne's captain-coach at the time he was recruited.

Notes

External links 

Demonwiki profile

1902 births
1984 deaths
Australian rules footballers from Victoria (Australia)
Melbourne Football Club players